Uzlovoy (masculine), Uzlovaya (feminine), or Uzlovoye (neuter) is the name of several inhabited localities in Russia.

Urban localities
Uzlovaya, a town in Uzlovsky District of Tula Oblast; administratively incorporated as a town under district jurisdiction

Rural localities
Uzlovoy, Krasnodar Krai, a settlement in Bagovsky Rural Okrug of Mostovsky District of Krasnodar Krai
Uzlovoy, Orenburg Oblast, a settlement in Karavanny Selsoviet of Orenburgsky District of Orenburg Oblast
Uzlovoye, Guryevsky District, Kaliningrad Oblast, a settlement in Khrabrovsky Rural Okrug of Guryevsky District of Kaliningrad Oblast
Uzlovoye, Krasnoznamensky District, Kaliningrad Oblast, a settlement in Vesnovsky Rural Okrug of Krasnoznamensky District of Kaliningrad Oblast